Sant'Agostino is an underground station on the Milan Metro Line 2, located under Piazza Sant'Agostino, in Milan's Municipality 1. It was opened on 30 October 1983 as part of the extension of the line from Cadorna to Porta Genova. 

The station is the only one on Line 2 with the opposite tracks and platforms built on different levels, the northbound platform being above the southbound one. The same technique was later replicated in the central section of Line 3, from Turati to Crocetta stations.

References

Line 2 (Milan Metro) stations
Railway stations opened in 1983